Phenuiviridae is a family of negative-strand RNA viruses in the order Bunyavirales. Ruminants, camels, humans, and mosquitoes serve as natural hosts. Member genus Phlebovirus is the only genus of the family that has viruses that cause disease in humans (e.g. Rift Valley fever virus) except Dabie bandavirus.

Virology

Structure 

Members of Phenuiviridae are enveloped viruses with helical capsid morphology. Envelope glycoproteins of these viruses are distributed with icosahedral symmetry (T=12).

Genome 
Phenuiviridae is a negative-sense single-stranded RNA virus family. Its genome is segmented into three pieces: L segment (encoding RNA-dependent RNA polymerase), M segment, and S segment.

Some members of the family have ambisense gene encoding on the S segment (nucleocapsid proteins). The M segment includes envelope glycoproteins encoded in a polyprotein that is cleaved by host proteases. Multiple different proteins can be encoded on the M segment due to leaky scanning by the ribosome.

Life cycle 
RNA transcripts are capped through cap snatching, but not polyadenylated. Translation is terminated by a hairpin sequence at the end of each RNA transcript.

Taxonomy 
The following genera are recognized:

 Bandavirus
 Beidivirus
 Coguvirus
 Entovirus
 Goukovirus
 Horwuvirus
 Hudivirus
 Hudovirus
 Ixovirus
 Laulavirus
 Lentinuvirus
 Mobuvirus
 Phasivirus
 Phlebovirus
 Pidchovirus
 Rubodvirus
 Tanzavirus
 Tenuivirus
 Uukuvirus
 Wenrivirus

References 

 
Bunyavirales
Virus families